Justin Schmidt may refer to:

 Justin O. Schmidt (1947–2023), American entomologist
 Justin Schmidt (soccer) (born 1993), American soccer player

See also
 Justin Schmitt (born 1974), Australian rules football field umpire